Granville Smith (born 4 February 1937) was a Welsh professional footballer, hailing from the small mining village of Penrhiwceiber. A speedy winger, he joined Newport County in 1960 from Bristol Rovers. He went on to make 241 Football League appearances for Newport scoring 38 goals. In 1968, he joined Bath City.

References

External links

Welsh footballers
Newport County A.F.C. players
Bristol Rovers F.C. players
English Football League players
Living people
Bath City F.C. players
Association football wingers
1937 births